Vijay  Chougule is Shiv Sena Politician from Navi Mumbai, Maharashtra. He was the Leader of Opposition of Navi Mumbai Municipal Corporation. Also was Cidco Speaker in 2008.

Positions held
 2008-2014: Navi Mumbai Zilla Pramukh Shiv Sena 
 2015: Elected as corporator in Navi Mumbai Municipal Corporation 
 2015: Elected as Leader of Opposition of Navi Mumbai Municipal Corporation

See also
 Airoli Vidhan Sabha Constituency
 Thane Lok Sabha Constituency

References

External links
 Shivsena Home Page

Living people
Marathi politicians
Maharashtra politicians
Shiv Sena politicians
Politics of Thane district
Year of birth missing (living people)